Wijesundara Mudiyanselage Rohana Bandara Wijesundara (born 26 September 1977) is a Sri Lankan politician, former provincial councillor and Member of Parliament.

Bandara was born on 26 September 1977. He was a member of Galnewa Divisional Council and North Central Provincial Council. He contested the 2020 parliamentary election as a Samagi Jana Balawegaya electoral alliance candidate in Anuradhapura District and was elected to the Parliament of Sri Lanka.

References

1977 births
Local authority councillors of Sri Lanka
Living people
Members of the 16th Parliament of Sri Lanka
Members of the North Central Provincial Council
Samagi Jana Balawegaya politicians
Sinhalese politicians
Sri Lankan Buddhists
United National Party politicians